Mutton Cove may refer to:

 Mutton Cove, Biscoe Islands, Antarctica
 Mutton Cove, Portland, Dorset, England
 Mutton Cove Conservation Reserve, South Australia